The Scottish Cup is a knockout football tournament for men's football clubs in Scotland.

For the women's tournament see: Scottish Women's Cup.

Scottish Cup may also refer to:
Scottish Cup (basketball)
Scottish Cup (ice hockey)
Scottish Cup (rugby union)